Mash Out Posse is M.O.P.'s self-titled fifth album. This album is a rock-rap album which contains rock remixes of M.O.P.'s songs off other albums and some original songs. M.O.P. collaborated with the rock band Shiner Massive.

Track listing 
"Conquerors" (2:40)
"Ground Zero" (4:09)
"Put It in the Air" (3:21)
"Calm Down" (3:01)
"Stand Clear" (3:46)
"Fire" (4:59)
"Hilltop Flava (No Sleep 'Til Brooklyn)" (3:44)
"Stand Up" (4:55)
"Stress Y'All" (3:34)
"Raise Hell" (3:18)
"It's That Simple" (3:59)
"Get the Fuck Outta Here" (5:19)
"Ante Up/Robbin' Hoodz" (3:23)

Samples 
"Raise Hell" contains a sample of Angel of Death by Slayer

Charts

References

M.O.P. albums
Rap rock albums by American artists
2004 compilation albums